Naal Natchathiram is a 2009 Indian Tamil language romantic drama film directed by C. N. P. Sakthi. The film stars S. Sanjey and Krishna Sri, with Manorama, Delhi Ganesh, Pranas, Sanjeevi Kumar, Vijayas, Karan and Imaan playing supporting roles. The film, produced by C. Nagarajan, had musical score by R. Rajpavan and was released on 17 April 2009.

Plot

In a remote village, Kumar (S. Sanjey) is a wastrel who spends his time roaming with his jobless friends and drinking alcohol. Kumar comes across the village belle Uma (Krishna Sri), a student who wants to become a district collector, and instantly falls in love with her. He proposes his love to her but she insults him for being an uneducated brute. Kumar starts to stalk and tries to woo her and one day, Kumar is arrested by the police for misbehaving with Uma. Later, Uma's father arranges his daughter's engagement with another man. Kumar has no other choice than to tie the thaali around her neck (synonym of marriage) without her permission. Uma is disowned by her parents but only her grandmother Nagamma (Manorama) supports her.

The newly married couple leaves the village for the city Chennai. In Chennai, Kumar saves a businessman from rowdies and the man helps them to stay in his godown. Kumar gets a job in a gambling club and becomes the new club manager while Uma finds a job in a company. Despite being a good husband, Uma still hates Kumar and wants to divorce him. Kumar, who has now become a wealthy man, finally signs the divorce papers and Uma returns to her village.

Uma eventually understands the love of her husband and does not want to get divorced any more. In the meantime, Kumar is stabbed by one of his rivals but Kumar survives the attack. Kumar reveals to Uma and her family that the day he got married was an inauspicious day (Kari Naal). The film ends with Kumar and Uma getting married in their village on an auspicious day.

Cast

S. Sanjey as Kumar
Krishna Sri as Uma
Manorama as Nagamma
Delhi Ganesh as Advocate
Pranas as Kumar's friend
Sanjeevi Kumar as Kumar's friend
Vijayas as Kumar's friend
Karan as Kumar's friend
Imaan as Kumar's friend
Pichaiyappillai as Uma's grandfather
Kullamani
Meeran Khan
Pazhakadai Ravi
Arunachalam
Manoranjan
Ayyappan Gopi as Club member
Kottachi as Club member
Chinrasu as Club member
Seenivasan
A. T. Shanmugam
Shanthi
Kamalam as Kamalam, Uma's mother
Sivagami
Jayanthi
Bava Sudha
Bharathy in a special appearance

Production
C. N. P. Sakthi made his directorial debut with Naal Natchathiram under the banner of Pooja Creations. New faces S. Sanjey and Krishna Sri were selected to play the lead roles while veteran actress Manorama signed to play the grandmother role.

Soundtrack

The film score and the soundtrack were composed by R. Rajpavan. The soundtrack features 6 tracks and was released on 13 March 2009 at the Sri Devi Theatre in Chennai. Directors Perarasu and Praveen Gandhi attended the function.

References

2009 films
2000s Tamil-language films
Indian romantic drama films
2009 romantic drama films